Offlicence are an international hip hop, bhangra and R&B group from the West Midlands, UK. The group members consists of Punjabi vocalist Sunny J of South Asian descent, alongside rappers Lexeye and Projay, both of Caribbean descent.

Offlicence have had success in the Official UK Asian Download Chart starting with their debut single "Maar Glassi" that charted at #5 in June 2010. Their most successful single was "Ghaint Patola", which charted at #2 and peaked at #1 on the iTunes Store Top 10 World Song Chart in April 2011.

In 2007, Offlicence collaborated with music producer PBN (Panjabi By Nature) on the song titled "Jaan Panjabi". In 2008, they released their debut album Desilution featuring Apache Indian on the lead track "Indian Ting". The song was previously liked by TV show BBC Midlands Today, who used Offlicence for a campaign to end the friction between communities involved in the 2005 Birmingham race riots in Birmingham.

New single Style is set for release 17 January 2013 which sees Offlicence team up with UK rapper Trilla Jermaine Trilloski and producer Panjabi MC.

Discography

Singles
2013: "Style" (Offlicence,Trilla Jermaine Trilloski and Panjabi MC)
2011: "Ghaint Patola" (DJ Shadow Dubai & Plus91 Official Remix)
2011: "Ghaint Patola"
2010: "Maar Glassi"
2015: "Gallan"

Albums
2008: Desilution

References

External links 
 BBC Music - Offlicence 
 Offlicence music 
 Panjabi By Nature 
 BBC Radio One - Offlicence 

Bhangra (music) musical groups
English hip hop groups
British contemporary R&B musical groups
Musical groups established in 2008